Symmetry-adapted linear combination may refer to:
 The linear combination of atomic orbitals in the subject of molecular orbitals
 Configuration state function, the linear combination of Slater determinants
 Orbital hybridization, the linear combination of orbitals on the same atom in valence bond theory
 Resonance (chemistry), the linear combination of contributing structures in valence bond theory